Matthias Præst Nielsen (born 21 June 2000) is a Danish footballer who plays for Danish 2nd Division club Middelfart Boldklub as a defender.

Career

Club career
On 27 July 2020 it was confirmed, that Præst had joined Danish 2nd Division club Middelfart Boldklub on a deal until the summer 2022.

References

Living people
2000 births
Association football defenders
Danish men's footballers
AC Horsens players
Danish Superliga players
Middelfart Boldklub players